Bloodvein River Airport  is located adjacent to Bloodvein River, Manitoba, Canada and serves the Bloodvein First Nation.

References

External links
 Page about this airport on COPA's Places to Fly airport directory

Certified airports in Manitoba